The 1973 Oklahoma Sooners football team represented the University of Oklahoma in the 1973 NCAA Division I football season.  Oklahoma participated as members of the Big Eight Conference and played its home games in Gaylord Family Oklahoma Memorial Stadium where it has played its home games since 1923.  The team posted a 10–0–1 overall record and a 7–0 conference record to earn the Conference outright title under first-year head coach Barry Switzer.  This would be the first of eight consecutive Big Eight Conference championships for the Sooners with Switzer as head coach.

The team was led by three All-Americans: Rod Shoate (Oklahoma's second three-time All-American) the oldest of the Selmon brothers, Lucious, and Eddie Foster. The Selmon brothers Lucious, Lee Roy and Dewey started on the defensive line. The team went undefeated on a schedule that included seven ranked opponents (In order, #1 USC, #17 Miami, #13 Texas, #13 Colorado, #10 Missouri, #18 Kansas, and #10 Nebraska).  Five of these opponents finished the season ranked.  The team tied with USC in the second game of the season before winning nine consecutive contests.  It began the season ranked number 11 and steadily climbed in the polls as the season progressed.

Joe Washington led the team in rushing with 1173 yards, Steve Davis led the team in passing yard for with 934 yards, Tinker Owens led the team in receiving with 472 yards, Davis led the team in scoring with 108 points, Shoate led the team in tackles with 126, and Randy Hughes led the team in interceptions with 5.

Prior to the season in August, the Sooners were put on probation by the Big Eight Conference, which included a two-year ban on bowl appearances, and a two-year ban on television appearances (1974, 1975).

Schedule

Personnel

Game summaries

at Baylor

at USC

Miami (FL)

vs Texas

Worst loss in Darrell Royal's coaching career

Colorado

at Kansas State

Iowa State

    
    
    
    
    
    
    
    

Joe Washington 136 Rush Yds

at Missouri

Kansas

Nebraska

at Oklahoma State

Rankings

Awards and honors
All-American: Rod Shoate, Eddie Foster and Lucious Selmon
Big Eight Athlete of the Year: Selmon
Big Eight Defensive Player: Selmon
Chevrolet Defensive Player of the Year: Selmon

Postseason

NFL draft
Seven Sooners were selected in the 1974 NFL Draft.

References

External links
 1973 season at SoonerStats.com
 Sports Reference – 1973 Oklahoma football season

Oklahoma
Oklahoma Sooners football seasons
Big Eight Conference football champion seasons
College football undefeated seasons
Oklahoma Sooners football